Naaran (also Na'aran) is an ancient Jewish village dating to the 5th and 6th century CE, located in the modern-day West Bank. Remains of the village have been excavated north of Jericho, in Ephraim, between Bethel and Jericho. Naaran is archeologically notable for a mosaic floor of a synagogue, featuring a large zodiac design, which was discovered at the site.

Naaran is mentioned in Joshua 16:7 and 1 Chronicles 7:28 as a town in the eastern part of Ephraim. Eusebius, in his Onomasticon, makes mention of the site, saying that in his day it was "a village inhabited by Jews, five [Roman] miles from Jericho." The site is also named in the writings of Josephus (Antiquities 17.13.1), under its name, and in the Midrash Rabba (Leviticus Rabbah 23:5), which notes the rivalry between Naaran and the neighboring gentile city of Jericho.

An Israeli settlement, kibbutz Niran, located several kilometers to the north, takes its name from Naaran. The community of Mevo'ot Yericho is adjacent to the actual archaeological site.

Synagogue
Aramaic inscriptions and mosaics from the synagogue are displayed at an archaeology museum established by the Israeli archaeologist Yitzhak Magen at the Good Samaritan Inn.

In May 2012, the ancient synagogue was vandalized with graffiti that included swastikas and Palestinian flags. Israel's Public Diplomacy Minister Yuli-Yoel Edelstein condemned the act and noted that, "The incident reaffirms the belief that Jewish holy sites must be under Israel's sovereignty."

See also
 Shalom Al Yisrael Synagogue (6th century) in nearby Jericho
 Yitav, nearby Israeli settlement
 Oldest synagogues in the world
 Archaeology of Israel

References

Jericho
Archaeological sites in the West Bank
Synagogues in the West Bank
Historic Jewish communities
Ancient synagogues in the Land of Israel
Ancient Jewish settlements of Judaea
Israeli mosaics